Mayfield is a town in Fulton County, New York, United States, northeast of Gloversville and Johnstown. The town contains a village also named Mayfield. The population of the town was 6,495 at the 2010 census.

History
The land that is now the town was part of the Mayfield Patent of 1770. The town was established in 1793 from the town of Caughnawaga in Montgomery County before the formation of Fulton County in 1838. It was one of the first three such towns formed. Part of Mayfield was taken in 1805 to form the town of Wells (now in Hamilton County). An additional part of Mayfield was added to Wells in 1812. Mayfield was reduced once again in 1842 to form the town of Perth. The early economy was based on lumber and leather production. The Oliver Rice House located on Old NY 30 was listed on the National Register of Historic Places in 1995.

Geography
Mayfield is mostly within the Adirondack Park and is on the southwestern shore of Great Sacandaga Lake. New York State Route 30 is an important north-south highway in Mayfield. NY-30 intersects New York State Route 30A at Riceville. New York State Route 349 is an east-west highway in the southern part of the town. East-west highways New York State Route 29 and New York State Route 29A converge in the southern part of Mayfield, east of Vail Mills.

Demographics

As of the census of 2000, there were 6,432 people, 2,535 households, and 1,804 families residing in the town.  The population density was 110.1 people per square mile (42.5/km2).  There were 3,211 housing units at an average density of 55.0 per square mile (21.2/km2).  The racial makeup of the town was 97.99% White, 0.39% Black or African American, 0.22% Native American, 0.42% Asian, 0.47% from other races, and 0.51% from two or more races. Hispanic or Latino of any race were 0.87% of the population.

There were 2,535 households, out of which 32.7% had children under the age of 18 living with them, 55.7% were married couples living together, 10.3% had a female householder with no husband present, and 28.8% were non-families. 23.1% of all households were made up of individuals, and 10.8% had someone living alone who was 65 years of age or older.  The average household size was 2.53 and the average family size was 2.95.

In the town, the population was spread out, with 25.2% under the age of 18, 6.4% from 18 to 24, 28.2% from 25 to 44, 26.1% from 45 to 64, and 14.1% who were 65 years of age or older.  The median age was 39 years. For every 100 females, there were 98.2 males.  For every 100 females age 18 and over, there were 95.6 males.

The median income for a household in the town was $37,982, and the median income for a family was $42,289. Males had a median income of $30,326 versus $22,105 for females. The per capita income for the town was $17,972.  About 5.9% of families and 8.6% of the population were below the poverty line, including 11.9% of those under age 18 and 7.4% of those age 65 or over.

Communities and locations in the town

Inhabited locations 
 Broadalbin – A small western part of the village of Broadalbin, located on NY-29, is inside the town of Mayfield.
 Broadalbin Junction – A hamlet by the western town line on NY-30A southwest of Riceville.
 Cranberry Creek – A hamlet in the northeastern corner of the town on NY-30. A stream called Cranberry Creek flows into Great Sacandaga Lake at the village.
 Dennies Hollow – A hamlet north of Mayfield village on NY-30.
 Jackson Summit – A location west of Mayfield village at the southern end of the Jackson Summit Reservoir.
 Mayfield – The village of Mayfield is in the southeastern part of the town.
 Munsonville – A hamlet at the western end of Great Sacandaga Lake, south of Mayfield village.
 Red Bunch Corners – A hamlet in the southern part of the town on NY-30.
 Riceville – A hamlet by the junction of Routes NY-30 and NY-30A.
 Tolmantown – A former settlement in the northwestern quarter of Mayfield.
 Vail Mills – A hamlet in the southeastern part of Mayfield on NY-30.
 Wilkins' Corners – A former community near Mayfield village.

Geographic locations 
 Beacon Island – A small island in Great Sacandaga Lake, north of Kunkel Point.
 Cameron Reservoir – A small reservoir near the northern town line.
 Jackson Summit Reservoir – A reservoir located in the northwestern part of the town.
 Kenyetto Creek – A stream in the southeastern section  of the town flowing westward, then north into Great Sacandaga Lake.
 Kunkel Point – A projection into Great Sacandaga Lake, north of Vandenburgh Point. The point, and road leading to it, are named for the late Robert S. Kunkel a prominent Gloversville doctor and one of the first people to buy property there. The Point remains in the Kunkel family.
 Mayfield Creek – A stream flowing eastward into Mayfield Lake.
 Mayfield Lake – A small lake south of Mayfield village, connecting to Great Sacandaga Lake.
 Paradise Point – A short projection into Great Sacandaga Lake northeast of Dennies Hollow.
 Scout Island – An island in the southwestern part of Great Sacandaga Lake.
 Vandenburgh Point – A short peninsula into Great Sacandaga Lake, northeast of Munsonville.

Landmark
 Oliver Rice House – A 1790 historical colonial home, now a museum.

References

External links

  Town of Mayfield official website

Towns in Fulton County, New York